Langari Langarieva Stadium, is a stadium in Kulob, Tajikistan. It has a capacity of 20,000 spectators.  It is the home of Ravshan Kulob of the Tajik League.

References

Football venues in Tajikistan